The 1973–74 United Counties League season was the 67th in the history of the United Counties League, a football competition in England.

Premier Division

The Premier Division featured 16 clubs which competed in the division last season, along with one new club:
St Neots Town, transferred from the Eastern Counties League

League table

Division One

The Division One featured 18 clubs which competed in the division last season, along with 2 new clubs, promoted from Division Two: 
Belsize
Northampton ON Chenecks

Also, Kettering Park Wanderers changed name to Burton Park Wanderers.

League table

Division Two

The Division Two featured 16 clubs which competed the division last season, along with 3 new clubs: 
Newport Pagnell Town, transferred from the South Midlands League
Long Buckby reserves
Northampton Spencer reserves

League table

References

External links
 United Counties League

1973–74 in English football leagues
United Counties League seasons